Cerberilla bernadettae is a species of sea slug, an aeolid nudibranch, a marine heterobranch mollusc in the family Aeolidiidae.

Distribution
This species was described from la pointe de la Fumée, Île-d'Aix, Charente-Maritime on the Atlantic coast of France. It has been reported from Italy and Tunisia.

Description
All Cerberilla species have a broad foot and the cerata are numerous, arranged in transverse rows across the body. In this species the body and cerata are mostly translucent white. There are dark brown lines forming an inverted V on the front of the head. The cerata have a black mark on the upper surface just below the opaque white tip. The long oral tentacles have a white band on the upper surface and yellow-orange tips. The small rhinophores are yellow-orange.

Ecology 
Species of Cerberilla live on and in sandy substrates where they burrow beneath the surface and feed on burrowing sea anemones.

References

 Gofas, S.; Le Renard, J.; Bouchet, P. (2001). Mollusca. in: Costello, M.J. et al. (Ed.) (2001). European register of marine species: a check-list of the marine species in Europe and a bibliography of guides to their identification. Collection Patrimoines Naturels. 50: pp. 180–213.

Aeolidiidae
Gastropods described in 1965